The Lukacs Distinguished Professor chair was established in 1989 by the Department of Mathematics and Statistics at Bowling Green State University in honor of Eugene Lukacs, who came to Bowling Green with his colleagues Radha Laha and Vijay Rohatgi in 1972 to establish the doctoral program in statistics. Eugene Lukacs was Bowling Green's first Distinguished University Professor.

Each year an outstanding senior researcher in probability or statistics is invited to serve as the Eugene Lukacs Distinguished Visiting Professor during the academic year or a semester. The Lukacs Professors are invited based on their distinguished record of research in the application or theory of probability or statistics. The Lukacs professor typically collaborates with current faculty on research, participates in seminars and colloquia, and typically gives a graduate course or presents a series of related seminars. Lukacs Professors have organized Lukacs Symposia on a variety of topics in probability and statistics.

Lukacs Distinguished Visiting Professors

See also
 List of statisticians
 History of statistics

References

External links 
 Statistics for the 21st Century, 1998 Lukacs Symposium, organized by C. R. Rao.
 Frontiers of Environmental and Ecological Statistics for the 21st Century: Synergistic Challenges, Opportunities and Directions for Statistics, Ecology, Environment, and Society  1999 Lukacs Symposium convened by G. P. Patil.

 
Statistics-related lists